Salvador Macamo (born 27 September 1976) is a Mozambican footballer. He played in ten matches for the Mozambique national football team from 1997 to 2002. He was also named in Mozambique's squad for the 1998 African Cup of Nations tournament.

References

External links
 

1976 births
Living people
Mozambican footballers
Mozambique international footballers
1998 African Cup of Nations players
Place of birth missing (living people)
Association footballers not categorized by position